Manek is a given name and surname. Notable people with the name include:

Given name

People
Manek Bedi, Bollywood actor
Manek Mathur (born 1988), Indian squash player
Manek Premchand, Indian writer and historian of film music

Fictional characters
Manek Tigelaar, character from Wicked novel series

Surname
Brady Manek (born 1998), American basketball player
Chronox Manek (died 2012), Chief Ombudsman of Papua New Guinea
Gabriel Manek (1913–1989), Indonesian Archbishop of The Roman Catholic Church
Gia Manek (born 1986), Indian television actress
Jayesh Manek (born 1956), Indian fund manager
Pabubha Manek, Indian politician
Roma Manek, Indian actress from Gujarati

See also